Civula (also known as Quibula) was one of the traditional independent Ovimbundu kingdoms in Angola.

See also
Cingolo
Civula
Ciyaka
Ekekete
Kingdom of Ndulu

References

Ovimbundu kingdoms